Randall Eugene Bewley (July 25, 1955 – February 25, 2009) was the guitarist for the Athens, Georgia, band Pylon. Born in Bradenton, Florida, United States. He lived in Sarasota, Florida, Washington, DC and near Atlanta, Georgia while growing up. Bewley attended the University of Georgia art school where he met Michael Lachowski, a fellow art student. They became roommates and decided to form a band.  He and Lachowski, along with fellow art students Vanessa Briscoe Hay and Curtis Crowe, formed Pylon, having their first performance in 1979. On their first trip to New York City, they were reviewed in Interview Magazine.

Bewley was a very influential guitarist and used the guitar to create not just notes, but interesting sounds as well. Pylon recorded three albums, three singles and one EP. The band has opened for U2, R.E.M., the B-52s, the Talking Heads and Gang of Four. Pylon broke up twice, but reunited and had been playing occasional shows.  Pylon's first album Gyrate was reissued in October 2007 by DFA records. Chomp was reissued in 2009.

Bewley was an art teacher for a while, but towards the end of his life devoted more time to his music and his own art. He also played with two other Athens projects: Sound Houses (formerly The New Sound of Numbers) and Supercluster.

On February 23, 2009, Bewley was driving on Barber Street in Athens when he suffered a heart attack.  According to the band's statement, his van drifted off the road and overturned.  He was admitted to Athens Regional Medical Center and lapsed into a coma; he died two days later on February 25 when he was removed from life support. He was 53.

Discography
Pylon
 Cool/Dub  7" single (Caution Records 1979)
 Gyrate LP (DB Records, Armageddon 1980)
 Pylon !! 10" EP (DB Records, Armageddon 1980)
 Crazy/M-Train  7" single (DB Records 1981)
 Beep/Altitude  7" single (DB Records 1982)
 Four Minutes/Beep/Altitude  EP (DB Records 1982)
 Chomp LP (DB Records 1983)
 Hits LP/CD (DB Records 1988)
 Chain LP/CD (Sky Records 1990)
 Gyrate Plus CD (DFA Records 2007)
 Chomp MoreCD (DFA Records 2009)
 Gravity/Weather Radio  7" single (Chunklet 2016)
 Pylon Live Double LP   (Chunklet 2016)

Supercluster
 Special 5 EP CD-R (self-issued, 2008)
 Waves CD CD (Studio Mouse Productions for Cloud Recordings, 2009)
 I Got the Answer/Sunflower Clock  7" single (Cloud Recordings 2009)

Other
 Dead Letter Office (LP) LP (IRS Records 1985) (Cover of "Crazy" by R.E.M.)
 Cover + Remix 7" single (DFA Records, October 2011) (Cover of "Cool" by Deerhunter, Remix of Yo-Yo by Calvinist)

Video 
 Beep (1990), Pylon, from CD: Hits, a compilation, DB Records
 Look Alive (1992), Pylon, from album :Chain, Sky Records

Filmography 
 Athens, GA.: Inside/Out (1987), archive footage

References

Reynolds, Simon: Rip It Up and Start Again: Postpunk 1978-1984, Penguin Books, February 2006, p. 264.
Strong,Martin Charles: The Great Indie Discography, Canongate Books, October 2003, p. 282.
Christgau,Robert: Christgau's Consumer Guide-the 80's, Pantheon Books, 1990, pp. 329, 498, 506.

External links
 Pylon official web site
 PARTY ZONE: a tribute to Pylon
 Pylon unofficial web site
 [ AllMusic entry on Pylon]
 Pylon MySpace web page
 Supercluster MySpace web page

1955 births
2009 deaths
University of Georgia alumni
Guitarists from Georgia (U.S. state)
People from Bradenton, Florida
American rock guitarists
American male guitarists
American new wave musicians
20th-century American guitarists
20th-century American male musicians
Pylon (band) members